Đinh Đăng Định (20 April 1920 – 11 August 2013) was the personal photographer to Ho Chi Minh. He also co-founded the Vietnam Artistic Photographer's Association (VAPA) with Lâm Tấn Tài.

Early years
Đinh Đăng Định was born in Kiêu Kỵ, Hanoi, Vietnam.

Career

Anti-French Resistance (1936–1945)
In 1936, Đinh joined the anti-French resistance. However, it wasn't until 1941 when Ho Chi Minh set up at anti-Japanese base at Pác Bó that Đinh was allowed to photograph political activities.

Personal photographer to Ho Chi Minh (1945 - 1969)
Đinh became the personal photographer to Ho Chi Minh, taking the first official portrait of him on 2 September 1945 in Hanoi. The portrait was meant to be distributed to the public to publicise his identity. From 1945 onwards, Đinh would accompany Ho Chi Minh to capture images of his meetings with French colonial commanders and other high-ranking members of the Communist Party of Vietnam as well as document people's support of Ho's resistance movement. Đinh worked in the Party's Central Office, taking photos of Ho Chi Minh until he died in 1969.

While in Hanoi, Đinh founded the Vietnam Artistic Photographer's Association (VAPA) on 8 December 1965.

Ho Chi Minh Trail (1974–1975)
After Ho's death, Đinh was tasked to go South and document route 9 of the Ho Chi Minh trail.

Accolades
In 2000, Đinh was awarded the Ho Chi Minh Prize for his contributions to photography.

References

1920 births
2013 deaths
Vietnamese photographers
Vietnamese independence activists
Vietnamese nationalists
Vietnamese people of the Vietnam War
Vietnamese revolutionaries